Beyond the Edge is a 2013 New Zealand 3D docudrama about Tenzing Norgay and Sir Edmund Hillary's historical ascent of Mount Everest in 1953. As well as featuring dramatised recreations shot on location on Everest and in New Zealand, the film includes original footage and photographs from what was then the ninth British expedition to the mountain. It also includes audio from interviews with Hillary and recorded narration by expedition leader John Hunt.

The film premiered at the 2013 Toronto International Film Festival on 6 September 2013, where it won positive reviews from fans and film critics. The Toronto Star gave it 3.5 out of 4 stars. It was second runner-up in competition for the People's Choice Award. It premiered in New Zealand on 22 October 2013.

Cast
Chad Moffitt: Sir Edmund Hillary 
Sonam Sherpa: Tenzing Norgay
John Wraight: John Hunt, Baron Hunt
Joshua Rutter: George Lowe
Dan Musgrove: Tom Bourdillon

References

External links
 Official website
 
 Beyond the Edge at the Toronto International Film Festival website
 Beyond the Edge at the New Zealand Film Commission website
 NZ on Screen website

2013 films
2013 3D films
Docudrama films
Films shot in Nepal
Films shot in New Zealand
Mountaineering films
Films about Mount Everest
New Zealand drama films
Cultural depictions of New Zealand men
Cultural depictions of Tibetan men
Cultural depictions of explorers
2013 drama films
Avalanches in film
2010s English-language films